Perkhurovo is a rural locality (a village) in Kadnikov, Sokolsky District, Vologda Oblast, Russia. The population was 3 as of 2002.

Geography 
Perkhurovo is located 44 km east of Sokol (the district's administrative centre) by road. Bratskoye is the nearest rural locality.

References 

Rural localities in Sokolsky District, Vologda Oblast